Knut Lunde  (22 February 1905 - 31 May 1960) was a Norwegian nordic combined skier who competed in early 1930s. He won an individual bronze at the 1930 FIS Nordic World Ski Championships in Oslo.

External links

Norwegian male Nordic combined skiers
1905 births
1960 deaths
FIS Nordic World Ski Championships medalists in Nordic combined
20th-century Norwegian people